Sayyid Murtadha Husayni al-Fayadh (9 April 1929 - 20 August 2014, Arabic: السيد مرتضى الحسيني فياض) was an Iraqi Twelver Shi'a Marja.

He has studied in seminaries of Najaf, Iraq under Abul-Qassim Khoei and Muhsin al-Hakim.

See also
List of Maraji

Notes

External links

Iraqi grand ayatollahs
1929 births
Iraqi Shia Muslims
2014 deaths